Kosteyevo is a rural locality (a village) in Yesiplevskoye Rural Settlement, Kolchuginsky District, Vladimir Oblast, Russia. The population was 9 as of 2010.

Geography 
Kosteyevo is located 15 km east of Kolchugino (the district's administrative centre) by road. Novoselka is the nearest rural locality.

References 

Rural localities in Kolchuginsky District